The Bacillaceae are a family of gram-positive, heterotrophic, rod-shaped bacteria that may produce endospores. Motile members of this family are characterized by peritrichous flagella. Some Bacillaceae are aerobic, while others are facultative or strict anaerobes. Most are not pathogenic, but Bacillus species are known to cause disease in humans.

Gram-variable cell wall
Some Bacillaceae, such as the genera Filobacillus, Lentibacillus, and Halobacillus, stain Gram-negative or Gram-variable, but are known to have a Gram-positive cell wall.

Nomenclature
Taxa within this family are sometimes colloquially identified as bacilli.  However, this term is ambiguous because it does not distinguish between class Bacilli, order Bacillales, family Bacillaceae, and genus Bacillus.

Genera
The polyphyletic family Bacillaceae comprises the following:

See Also
 List of bacteria genera
 List of bacterial orders

References

 
Bacillales